The muriquis, also known as woolly spider monkeys, are the monkeys of the genus Brachyteles. They are closely related to both the spider monkeys and the woolly monkeys. The two species are the southern (B. arachnoides) and northern (B. hypoxanthus) muriquis. They are the two largest species of New World monkeys, and the northern species is one of the most endangered of all the world's monkeys.

The muriqui is the largest monkey in South America, and it lives primarily in coffee estates in Southeastern Brazil. Males are the same size and weight as females.

References

Further reading

External links

 Conservation of the Muriqui from Brazil 
 
 
Primate Info Net Brachyteles Factsheet
 Southern Muriqui Home Page - Pró- Muriqui Association